Events from the year 1910 in Scotland.

Incumbents 

 Secretary for Scotland and Keeper of the Great Seal – John Sinclair, 1st Baron Pentland

Law officers 
 Lord Advocate – Alexander Ure
 Solicitor General for Scotland – Arthur Dewar; then William Hunter

Judiciary 
 Lord President of the Court of Session and Lord Justice General – Lord Dunedin
 Lord Justice Clerk – Lord Kingsburgh

Events 
 June – Edinburgh Missionary Conference is held, presided over by Nobel Peace Prize recipient John R. Mott, launching the modern ecumenical movement and the modern missions movement.
 6–13 August – First Scottish International Aviation Meeting held at Lanark.
 17 September – Andrew Blain Baird makes the first powered monoplane flight in Scotland, at Ettrick Bay on the Isle of Bute in a self-built machine.
 19 December – Alhambra Theatre, Glasgow opened
 The whisky-based liqueur Drambuie is first marketed commercially, from Leith.

Births 
 6 May – Jerry Morris, epidemiologist (died 2009)
 10 March – Jane Duncan, born Elizabeth Jane Cameron, novelist (died 1976)
 17 March – Molly Weir, actress (died 2004 in London)
 19 April – Andrew Gilchrist, Special Operations Executive operative, and later ambassador (died 1993) 
 23 April – Sheila Scott Macintyre, mathematician (died 1960) 
 15 July – George Friel, novelist (died 1975)
 1 September – Charles Maxwell, radio producer (died 1998)
 14 November – Norman MacCaig, poet (died 1996)
 December – Ian Donald, physician, pioneer in the use of Medical ultrasonography (died 1987)

Deaths 
 18 January – James Cuthbertson, Scottish-Australian poet and schoolteacher (born 1851)
 2 April – William McTaggart, landscape and marine painter (born 1835)
 6 April – John McLaren, Lord McLaren, Liberal politician (born 1831)
 13 April – William Quiller Orchardson, portraitist and painter (born 1832)
 15 April – John Smith, dentist, philanthropist and pioneering educator (born 1825)
 10 May – William Gordon Stables, naval physician and novelist (born 1840)
 23 June – Robert Boog Watson, malacologist and Free Church minister (born 1823)

See also 
 Timeline of Scottish history
 1910 in the United Kingdom

References 

 
Scotland
Years of the 20th century in Scotland
1910s in Scotland